Radio Turks and Caicos (RCT98FM) is a public radio station broadcasting to the British Overseas Territory of Turks and Caicos Islands. It is owned by the Government of the Turks and Caicos Islands.

History
Radio Turks and Caicos was founded by Cable and Wireless.

References

Turks and Caicos Islands